Peter Lee (born 14 October 1955) is an Irish retired Gaelic footballer who played as a centre-back with the Galway senior team.

Honours

 Galway
 Connacht Senior Football Championship (2): 1983, 1984
 National Football League (1): 1980-81

References

1955 births
Living people
Caherlistrane Gaelic footballers
Galway inter-county Gaelic footballers